Minnesota State Highway 152 was a highway in Minnesota, connecting the cities of St. Cloud and Minneapolis. It ran parallel to U.S. Route 52 and its route number derives from this. It originally began at U.S. 52 in St. Cloud and ran to U.S. 52 in Minneapolis, at the intersection of Washington Avenue and Broadway Street.

Route description
Highway 152 served as an alternate of U.S. 52, running northwest–southeast from St. Cloud to Minneapolis.

Legally, the route was defined as routes 129 and 239 in the Minnesota Statutes § 161.115(60) and § 161.115(170). It was not marked with these numbers.

History
Highway 152 was authorized in 1933, with a segment running through downtown St. Cloud to Sauk Rapids authorized in 1949.

Most of the highway was replaced by Interstate 94 in the late 1970s, moving the highway's north terminus to Highway 101 in Dayton. The section from I-94 into St. Cloud became CSAH 75.

In 1980, the road was turned back south of Highway 100. It was rolled back further in 1984, with the Brooklyn Boulevard section becoming CSAH 152. The remainder was turned back in the 1988 highway swap with Hennepin County, becoming CSAH 81.

Major intersections

References

External links

Highway 152 at the Unofficial Minnesota Highways Page

152
U.S. Route 52
152